Claudionor Souza de Jesus (born March 5, 1993), nicknamed Lelêu, is a Brazilian professional footballer who plays as an attacking midfielder for Icasa.

Career

Atlético Mineiro & Loans
Leleu, as he is commonly known, began his professional career in the year of 2011, playing for Atlético Mineiro. Leleu's first match was against Democrata-GV, for the Campeonato Mineiro. 
In the year of 2012, Leleu was borrowed for the Brazilian club Paysandu, but returned to his former club in the same year.
Returning to Atlético Mineiro at Belo Horizonte for 2013, he scored his first Brasileiro Série A goal on July 7 in a 3-2 win against Criciúma.

In 2014, he is loan at Náutico in Série B where he scored 1 goal for 16 appearances. After that season and during 3 years, he is loaned at different Brazilian clubs from weaker leagues like Paysandu, Madureira and Boa.

Shonan Bellmare / Mito HollyHock
He changes country and signs at Hiratsuka for Shonan Bellmare for the 2019 season. He made his Japanese debut for the club on March 13 in a J.League Cup Group stage match against Yokohama F. Marinos where he also scored his first goal with the club to secure a 2-0 win. After another goal in J.League Cup and 2 appearances in J1 League, he is loaned at Mito HollyHock in J2 League for the rest of the season.

Honours
Atlético Mineiro
Campeonato Mineiro: 2013
Copa Libertadores: 2013

References

External links

Living people
1993 births
Brazilian footballers
Campeonato Brasileiro Série A players
Clube Atlético Mineiro players
Paysandu Sport Club players
Clube Náutico Capibaribe players
Madureira Esporte Clube players
Boa Esporte Clube players
J1 League players
J2 League players
J3 League players
Shonan Bellmare players
FC Gifu players
Association football midfielders
Footballers from Rio de Janeiro (city)